Betty Cardenas is an American political activist. She served as the National Chairwoman of the Republican National Hispanic Assembly (RNHA) during the Trump Administration.

Education 
Cardenas graduated from UNIVA (Universidad del Valle de Atemajac) with a Bachelor of Arts, earning a degree in Political Science & Government and a minor in Computer Science.

Career 
Cardenas started her career by teaching English and one of her students was Aleida Núñez, who later became a soap opera actress. In September 2018, during the RNHA Convention, Cardenas was elected National Chairwoman by unanimous vote. She had previously served as the RNHA's National Finance Chair. In 2019, she met President Trump's campaign manager, Brad Parscale, and Senior adviser, John Pence, to discuss a new outreach strategy for Hispanics, different from the Republican National Committee (RNC). She joined the board of Donald J. Trump's "Latinos for Trump" re-election campaign and served as an active advisor. She has also served on the board of some notable and historic political parties and is a National Partner of the American Latino Museum.

Cardenas also played a role in the Mayra Flores Special election, which ran with a strong message of embracing your Latino values. Mayra often credits Cardenas for taking her under the wing. She is an active advocate for the second amendment and is one of the few Latinas who openly supported former U.S President, Donald J. Trump, from the beginning.

Achievements 
Cardenas tops the list of Hispanics most personally invited by the President of the United States to the White House. She was among last year’s Tribute to Women by the Texas Federation of Republican Women.

References 

American political activists
Universidad del Valle de Atemajac alumni
Living people

Year of birth missing (living people)